Wrightudora is a genus of land snails with an operculum, terrestrial gastropod mollusks in the family Pomatiidae.

Species 
Species within the genus Wrightudora include:
 Wrightudora aguayoi (Torre & Bartsch, 1941)
 Wrightudora arcticoronata (Torre & Bartsch, 1941)
 Wrightudora asperata (Torre & Bartsch, 1941)
 Wrightudora banensis Aguayo, 1944
 Wrightudora bermudezi (Torre & Bartsch, 1941)
 Wrightudora clenchi Aguayo & Jaume, 1954
 Wrightudora crassiuscula (Torre & Bartsch, 1941)
 Wrightudora cristata (Torre & Bartsch, 1941)
 Wrightudora enode (Gundlach in Pfeiffer, 1860)
 Wrightudora garridoiana (Gundlach in Pfeiffer, 1860)
 Wrightudora gibarana Aguayo, 1943
 Wrightudora gundlachi (Torre & Bartsch, 1941)
 Wrightudora laevistria Aguayo & Sánchez Roig, 1949
 Wrightudora obesa (Torre & Bartsch, 1941)
 Wrightudora recta (Gundlach in Pfeiffer, 1863)
 Wrightudora semicoronata (Gundlach in Pfeiffer, 1861)
 Wrightudora suavis (Torre & Bartsch, 1941)
 Wrightudora tuberculata (Torre & Bartsch, 1941)
 Wrightudora varicosa (Torre & Bartsch, 1941)

References 

Pomatiidae